The 2022 Diamond Head Classic was a mid-season eight-team college basketball tournament that was played on December 22, 23, and 25 at the Stan Sheriff Center in Honolulu, Hawaii. It was the thirteenth annual Diamond Head Classic tournament, and was part of the 2022–23 NCAA Division I men's basketball season. The 2022 field was announced in March, and featured George Washington, Hawaii, Iona, Pepperdine, Seattle, SMU, Utah State and Washington State.

Bracket
* – Denotes overtime period

Notes:
All games played at the Stan Sheriff Center in Honolulu, Hawaii.

References

Diamond Head Classic
Diamond Head Classic
Diamond Head Classic